The Murchison Mountains are a group of mountains in Fiordland National Park in New Zealand. It is the location where the South Island takahē, a type of bird presumed extinct, was rediscovered in 1948.

Flora and fauna 
Native birds recorded in the area include takahē, mohua, whio, kea, kaka, kakariki, New Zealand falcon, weka, rock wren, tomtit, tui, bellbird, fantail, rifleman, grey warbler, brown creeper, silver-eye, pipit and kiwi.

The 1948 discovery of the takahe, the largest living member of the rail family, happened after unrecognized bird footprints were found, and Geoffrey Orbell, an Invercargill-based physician, led an expedition to find the unknown bird. To this day it is the only place where wild takahē can be seen. It is the longest running conservation programme in New Zealand.

With the aim of protecting the native bird populations, the New Zealand Department of Conservation started a program in 2002 to control stoats in the area. In 2007, a population increase of stoats in the mountains after a beech and tussock mast seeding led to a halving of the takahē population. The numbers of red deer in the Murchison Mountains steadily grew between 1930 and 1973 but hunting on foot and helicopter reduced the population by 60% between 1973 and 1975. In a 1953 expedition to the Murchison Mountains for the Canterbury Museum, W. R. Philipson discovered a new type of plant from the genus Pachycladon, Pachycladon crenata. A study in 2007 found that the rock wren population in the Murchison Mountains had dropped by 44% in the last 20 years compared with a study in 1989.

References

External links
DoC page on Murchison Mountains

Mountain ranges of Fiordland
Fiordland National Park